Mario Boljat (born 31 August 1951 in Split, FPR Yugoslavia) is a Croatian-born Yugoslav retired football player.

International career
He made his debut for Yugoslavia in a November 1977 World Cup qualification match away against Romania and earned a total of 5 caps scoring no goals. His final international was a May 1978 friendly away against Italy.

Honours
Hajduk Split
Yugoslav First League (4): 1970–71, 1973–74, 1974–75, 1978–79

Yugoslav Cup (5): 1971–72, 1972–73, 1973–74, 1975–76, 1976–77

References

External links
 
 

1951 births
Living people
Footballers from Split, Croatia
Association football defenders
Yugoslav footballers
Yugoslavia international footballers
HNK Hajduk Split players
FC Schalke 04 players
Yugoslav First League players
Bundesliga players
Yugoslav expatriate footballers
Expatriate footballers in West Germany
Yugoslav expatriate sportspeople in West Germany